Wray Thomas (June 15, 1810 – October 16, 1883) was the 21st mayor of Columbus, Ohio and the 19th person to serve in that office.   He served Columbus during the American Civil War for two terms.  His successor was James G. Bull after 1864.

References

Bibliography

External links
Wray Thomas at Political Graveyard

Mayors of Columbus, Ohio
1810 births
1883 deaths
Ohio Democrats
University of Virginia alumni
Politicians from Richmond, Virginia